Rocky Mountain Way is a compilation album released in 1985 by rock musician Joe Walsh.

Reception
Writing retrospectively for AllMusic, critic Ben Davies wrote of the album "considering both the amount of classic Walsh songs not featured on Rocky Mountain Way and the many other more extensive and better chosen best-ofs available, this release is rather pointless."

Track listing 
All songs by Joe Walsh, except where noted.

References

External links

Joe Walsh albums
1985 compilation albums
MCA Records compilation albums